The Institute of Space and Planetary Astrophysics, also known as by its abbreviation ISPA, is a premier and national research institute of the University of Karachi, engaging the theoretical and applied studies and research into topics pertaining to Astronomy, Astrophysics, Satellite Communication, Space Flight Dynamics, Atmospheric Science, Climatology, GIS & Remote Sensing and other related subjects. The institute has network of various mathematics and physics laboratories located in various universities of Pakistan, while it operates a single Karachi University Astrophysics Observatory.

History

The institute was established by Karachi University's Department of Mathematics in 1994. It was established as an autonomous research institute with the idea for a space science astrophysics programme and an astronomical observatory was conceived right at the inception of the Karachi University. However, the trace of establishing such institute came in place in 1960, when Professor A.B.A Haleem, Professor of Political Science and Vice-Chancellor of the Karachi University, first obtained and procured the powerful astronomical telescope with relevant equipment from a West-German company. Known as Karachi University Astrophysics Observatory, an astronomical observatory was initiated under the administrative supervision of the Department of Mathematics of the Karachi University. Later in time, the Federal Government of Pakistan built a building to install the observatory which initially belonged to the Department of Mathematics. In 1994, the building and the observatory became a part of the ISPA with Prof. Dr. Jawaid Quamar as its first founding director.

Prof. Dr. Jawaid Quamar is credited for leading the institute at an academic and international level as he had attracted many students to do their research under his supervision and he also introduced new programmes in the relevant field in the country. The new metallic dome of the observatory was an evidence of Dr. Quamar's hard work and dedication.

Later, after the retirement of Dr. Quamar, Mr. M. Shahid Qureshi took charge of the institute in 2002. He regularized the academic programs at ISPA and lead the institute till 2010. Mr Qureshi earned his PhD from the same institute under the supervision of Prof. Dr. Nasiruddin Khan (of department of Mathematics, UOK). In Fact Dr. Qureshi was the third PhD of the institute, first being Prof. Dr. M. Ayub Khan Yousufzai, second Prof. Dr. M. Jawed Iqbal (the current Director of ISPA).

On June 4, 2015, a brief inaugural session took place at ISPA where, Prof. Dr. Jawaid Quamar inaugurate the ISPA Seminar Library in the memory of "Prof. Dr. Irshad Ahmed Khan Afridi", who was involved in the foundation of ISPA. The new name of ISPA seminar library (Dr. Irshad Ahmed Khan Afridi Seminar Library) was approved by the Syndicate of Karachi University.

Academic programmes

The ISPA offers undergraduate and graduate (even the doctoral level) programmes in particle physics, theoretical physics, astrophysics, plasma physics, and mathematics.

Undergraduate programme (Master of Science (M.Sc.)) — the institute offers a two years programme. The undergraduate programmes are taught with the advanced courses of engineering. The disciplines are listed below in which the programmes are being offered by the institute:
Computational Physics, Engineering Physics, Physics, Astronomy, Electrical physics, Mathematics, Applied Mathematics, Applied mechanics, Astrochemistry, Chemistry, and Computer Science.
 Master's and post-research programme (Master of Science (honors), Master of Physics, and/or Master of Philosophy) — the CHEP offers a two-year programme in the disciplines listed below:
Mathematics, Applied Mathematics, Computational Physics, Particle physics, Electrical physics, Quantum Physics, Solid State Physics, Theoretical Chemistry, Astrochemistry, Astrophysics, Chemistry, Biophysics, and Computer science.
Post-doctoral research and Doctoral programme (Doctor of Philosophy and Doctor of Science) — the institute manages the post-doctoral research and doctoral programmes that are expected to be completed in 2–5 years. The degrees are awarded by publishing a thesis supervised by the institute. The doctoral programmes that are offered are listed below.
Nuclear physics, Particle Physics, Theoretical physics, Mathematical physics, Laser physics, Atomic physics, AMO physics, Mathematics, Radiophysics, Astrophysics, Cosmology Nuclear chemistry, Analytical chemistry, Mathematical chemistry and Computer science.

References

Science and technology in Pakistan
Research institutes in Pakistan
Space programme of Pakistan
Astrophysics institutes
University of Karachi